Miresa argentifera is a moth of the family Limacodidae first described by Francis Walker in 1855. It is found in Sri Lanka.

The former subspecies Miresa argentifera kwantungensis Hering, 1931 was lifted to full species status in 2011.

References

Moths of Asia
Moths described in 1855
Limacodidae